The División de Honor 2015–16 was the 53rd  season of the top flight of the Spanish domestic field hockey competitions since its inception in 1958. It began in autumn 2015. Regular season first matchday was played on 26/27 September finishing on 1 May 2016. 

Final Four was played in Madrid on 27–29 May. Club Egara won the championship fifteen years after when defeating R.C. Polo 2–2 (5–4 p.s.o.).

Competition

Format
The División de Honor regular season takes place between September and April through 18 matchdays in a round-robin format. Upon completion of regular season, top eight teams qualified for championship playoff, while bottom two teams are relegated to División de Honor B. 

In the championship playoff, quarter-finals pairings are based as follows:

Points during regular season are awarded according to the following:
2 points for a win
1 points for a draw

Teams

Regular season standings

Play-offs

Top goalscorers

References

See also
2015–16 División de Honor Femenina de Hockey Hierba

External links
Official site

División de Honor de Hockey Hierba
Spain
field hockey
field hockey